William Wallace Sanger (born in Hartford, Connecticut, 10 August 1819; died in New York City, 8 May 1872) was a New York City physician who wrote a “groundbreaking” study of prostitution.

Biography
He began the study of medicine at Wheeling, Virginia (now part of West Virginia) in 1842, but soon afterward moved to New York City, and graduated from the New York College of Physicians and Surgeons in 1846. He was then appointed assistant at Bellevue Hospital, and subsequently was the first resident physician at Blackwell's Island. He afterward resigned and visited Europe, but in 1853 was reappointed.

During his second seven years' tenure of the office of resident physician, he was asked by the New York City alderman to look into the motives of prostitutes.  He oversaw police interviews of 2000 women at Blackwell's Island. The results of his study he embodied in a work characterized by laborious research and comprehensive classification of the facts that he obtained, entitled the History of Prostitution (New York, 1858). In 1860, Sanger resigned and devoted the remainder of his life to private practice.

References

External links
 
 
 
 

1819 births
1872 deaths
19th-century American physicians
New York College of Physicians and Surgeons alumni
Physicians from New York City